In association football, the manager is the person who runs a football club or a national team. They have wide-ranging responsibilities, including selecting the team, choosing the tactics, recruiting and transferring players, negotiating player contracts, and speaking to the media.

Responsibilities 
The manager's responsibilities in a professional football club usually include (but are not limited to) the following:

 Selecting the team of players for matches, and their formation.
 Planning the strategy, and instructing the players on the pitch.
 Motivating players before and during a match.
 Delegating duties to the first team coach and the coaching and medical staff.
 Scouting for young but talented players for eventual training in the youth academy or the reserves, and encouraging their development and improvement.
 Buying and selling players in the transfer market, including loans.
 Facing the media in pre-match and post-match interviews.

Some of the above responsibilities may be shared with a director of football or sporting director, and are at times delegated to an assistant manager or club coach.

Additionally, depending on the club, some minor responsibilities include:

 Marketing the club, most especially for ticket admission, sponsorship and merchandising.
 Growing turnover and keeping the club profitable.

These responsibilities are more common among managers of small clubs.

European and North American managers 
The title of manager is almost exclusively used in British football. In most other European countries in which professional football is played, the person responsible for the direction of a team is awarded the position of coach or "trainer". For instance, despite the general equivalence in responsibilities, Gareth Southgate is referred to as the manager of England, and Hansi Flick is described as the head coach of Germany. Germany also has a team manager role that is subordinate to the head coach and is currently held by Oliver Bierhoff.

The responsibilities of a European football manager or head coach tend to be divided up in North American professional sports, where the teams usually have a separate general manager and head coach (known as a field manager in baseball), although occasionally a person may fill both these roles. While the first team coach in football is usually an assistant to the manager who actually holds the real power, the North American-style general manager and head coach have clearly distinct areas of responsibilities. For example, a typical European football manager has the final say on in-game decisions (including player line-ups), and off-the-field and roster management decisions (including contract negotiations). In North American sports, those duties would be handled separately by the head coach and general manager, respectively.

See also 
 List of football managers with most games
 List of longest managerial reigns in association football
 Caretaker manager
 Player-manager
 League Managers Association for managers in England
 Football Manager, a simulation video game for playing as a manager.

References 

 
Association football terminology
Sports coaches
Association football occupations